Mirza Jatić (born 1 July 1993) is an Austrian football player who plays for FCM Traiskirchen.

Club career
He made his Austrian Football First League debut for SC Wiener Neustadt on 18 September 2015 in a game against SC Austria Lustenau.

Jatic joined FCM Traiskirchen on 1 January 2019.

References

External links
 
 Profile at FCM Traiskirchen

1993 births
Living people
Austrian footballers
SC Wiener Neustadt players
2. Liga (Austria) players
Association football fullbacks